Immortal is a 1986 album by gospel singer Cynthia Clawson. The hymn "Immortal Invisible" was a hit on contemporary Christian radio, and the album peaked at number 36 on the Billboard Top Contemporary Christian album chart.  Produced by John Rosasco, the album was released on Dayspring, a subsidiary of Word Records.

Track listing

References

1986 albums